Chariesterus is a genus of leaf-footed bugs in the family Coreidae. There are about 12 described species in Chariesterus.

Species
These 12 species belong to the genus Chariesterus:

 Chariesterus albiventris Burmeister, 1835
 Chariesterus alternatus Distant, 1881
 Chariesterus antennator (Fabricius, 1803) (euphorbia bug)
 Chariesterus armatus (Thunberg, 1825)
 Chariesterus bahamensis Ruckes, 1955
 Chariesterus balli Fracker, 1919
 Chariesterus brevipennis Van Duzee, 1937
 Chariesterus cuspidatus Distant, 1892
 Chariesterus gracilicornis Stål, 1870
 Chariesterus moestus Burmeister, 1835
 Chariesterus pardalinus Ruckes, 1955
 Chariesterus robustus Distant, 1892

References

Further reading

External links

 

Coreidae genera
Articles created by Qbugbot
Chariesterini